A list of films produced in Italy in 1991 (see 1991 in film):

See also
1991 in Italian television

External links
Italian films of 1991 at the Internet Movie Database

1991
Lists of 1991 films by country or language
Films